EU Secondary Ticketing Association, also known as EUSTA is a non-governmental, self-regulatory body based in the Netherlands, formed to provide self-regulation within the ticket resale industry in the European Union. EUSTA's aim is to ensure fairness and openness in the sale of event tickets and its members are required to comply with a stringent code of practice.

Code of practice
The EUSTA code of practice  covers all aspects of secondary ticket market practices -  however it can be summarized in the preamble:

 This code of conduct is laid down by the European Union Secondary Ticketing Association (“EUSTA”). It establishes rules of conduct and requirements for all secondary market parties that are associated with EUSTA.
 It is the aim of EUSTA to safeguard quality for buyers who have purchased (admission) tickets for an event from suppliers of (admission) tickets on the secondary market. In order to be able to offer the buyer transparency and guarantees when buying admission tickets on the secondary market, EUSTA has drawn up a number of rules of conduct and requirements.
 Companies bearing the EUSTA trademark meet these rules of conduct and requirements drawn up by EUSTA. These rules of conduct and requirements also serve to protect the buyer.

Founders and Participants
EUSTA was founded in 2009 by a group of Dutch Online ticket brokering companies engaged in Ticket resale in order to provide benchmarks to help legitimize and change negative public perception of the emerging free market around event ticketing online.

Well-known ex-Dutch Footballer and lawyer Keje Molenaar is the Chairman of EUSTA and the Secretary and treasurer is Marlies Hoedemaker.

Current EUSTA members  include:
 Worldticketshop
 PepeTickets
 Rang1Tickets
 Budgetticket BV, Budget Ticket and Online Ticketing Shop
 Tickets4u

Politics

EUSTA has been actively lobbying against a recently proposed Dutch bill to legislate the secondary ticket market in the Netherlands, an initiative of the Members of Parliament Arda Gerkens of the Socialist Party (SP) and Nicolien van Vroonhoven-Cook of the Christian Democratic Appeal (CDA). EUSTA has also protested vigorously against mass ticket cancellations by Mojo Concerts (Live Nation Entertainment) in the Dutch secondary Market.

References

External links
The English EUSTA website
The Dutch EUSTA website
STAR The Society of Ticket Agents and Retailers.  Self-regulatory ticket body for the UK entertainment industry.
National Association of Ticket Brokers: NATB is a non-profit trade association representing legitimate ticket brokers in the United States.
Association of Secondary Ticket Agents:ASTA is the UK's Secondary Ticket Industry regulatory body.
Better Ticketing Association: Better Ticketing is a broker-based USA organization.

EU Secondary Ticketing Association (EUSTA)
Self-regulatory organizations
Tickets
Pan-European trade and professional organizations
Regulation in the European Union